A. M. McNair House is a historic home located at Hartsville, Darlington County, South Carolina.  It was built in 1902, and is a two-story, three-bay, Late Victorian style frame residence on a brick foundation.  It has an asymmetrical plan and a pyramidal roof with cross gables.  It features a one-story, hip roof wraparound porch and a two-story gabled bay extension where the wraparound porch terminates.  It was the home of A.M. McNair (1857-1929), prominent Hartsville businessman who served as co-owner of McKinnon and McNair Department Store, founder and president of the Pee Dee Furniture Company, and vice president of the Bank of Hartsville.

It was listed on the National Register of Historic Places in 1994.

References

Houses on the National Register of Historic Places in South Carolina
Victorian architecture in South Carolina
Houses completed in 1902
Houses in Hartsville, South Carolina
National Register of Historic Places in Darlington County, South Carolina